Veggiano is a comune (municipality) in the Province of Padua in the Italian region Veneto, located about  west of Venice and about  northwest of Padua.

References

Cities and towns in Veneto